Hamza Hassini (born August 18, 1987) is a Tunisian amateur boxer. He qualified for the 2008 Olympics in the Light Welterweight division.

Hassini defeated, among others, Herbert Nkabiti and Abdelrahman Salah. A final loss to fellow qualifier Driss Moussaid was meaningless.

At the Olympics, he lost to Iranian Morteza Sepahvand.

External links
Qualifier

Living people
1987 births
Light-welterweight boxers
Boxers at the 2008 Summer Olympics
Olympic boxers of Tunisia
Tunisian male boxers
21st-century Tunisian people